Alpay Çelebi (born 4 April 1999) is a Turkish professional footballer who plays as a defender for Keçiörengücü.

Professional career
A youth product of Beşiktaş, Çelebi joined Kayserispor on a 1 year loan on 6 August 2019. Çelebi made his professional debut with Kayserispor in a 1-0 Süper Lig loss to Alanyaspor on 17 August 2019.

On July 7, 2022 Çelebi signed 2+1 year deal with Second League club Kocaelispor.

References

External links
 
 
 

1999 births
Living people
People from Derince
Turkish footballers
Turkey youth international footballers
Beşiktaş J.K. footballers
Kayserispor footballers
Alanyaspor footballers
Kocaelispor footballers
Adanaspor footballers

Süper Lig players
TFF First League players
TFF Second League players
Association football defenders